Busan Transportation Corporation FC, often referred to as 'the mighty' Busan Transportation Corporation FC is a semi-professional South Korean soccer club based in the city of Busan. The currently playing in K3 League for the 2020 season. They are owned and operated by Busan Transportation Corporation and play their home games at the Busan Gudeok Stadium, the spiritual home of football in the city and one of the venues for the 1988 Summer Olympics.

Founded in 2006, the club currently plays in the National League. In 2011, they reached the National league playoffs, as well as beating local K-League side Gyeongnam FC in the FA Cup. Their first trophy came in 2009, winning the National Sports Festival winners. They won the tournament again in 2013 retaining it in 2014 with victory on the island of Jeju, the first time a team has done this. With the National League Cup, which was won in 2010, that makes an impressive four trophies in only a 9-year history, something their city neighbours, I-Park, can only look upon with envy.

The club's biggest rivals are Changwon City, with whom they contest the Gyeongsangnam-do derby twice a year in what are always fiercely fought affairs. Other rivals include K-League team, Busan I-Park, who are largely seen as the city's pretenders following a move from the Gudeok Stadium to the more recently built Asiad Stadium, resulting in Busan Transportation Corporation taking on the nickname, the Real Busan FC. Lastly, they have a friendly rivalry with Daejeon Korail, whom they play against each season in what has been dubbed the Lokomotiv derby.

Current team squad

Current squad

Honours

Domestic competitions

Cups
 National League Championship
Winners (1): 2010
 National Sports Festival
Gold Medal (4): 2006, 2009, 2013, 2014
 President's Cup
Runners-up (1): 2006

Statistics

See also
List of football clubs in South Korea
Busan Gudeok Stadium

References

External links
  

 
Korea National League clubs
Sport in Busan
Association football clubs established in 2006
2006 establishments in South Korea
Railway association football clubs in South Korea